Sengbah Kennedy (born 8 April 1991) is Liberian international footballer who plays as a midfielder.

Honors

Clubs
Arema
 Indonesian Inter Island Cup Winner: 2014

Persiwa Wamena
 Liga Indonesia Premier Division Runner-up: 2014

Sime Darby
 FA Cup Malaysia Runners-up: 2012

Individual
 Liga Indonesia Premier Division Player of the Year: 2014

External links 
 

1991 births
Living people
Liberian footballers
Association football midfielders
Liberian expatriate footballers
Liberia international footballers